Vivian Manasc (born 1956) is a Canadian architect.

Early life and education
Born in Bucharest, Romania, Manasc moved to Canada with her parents in her childhood. She graduated from McGill University in Montreal, Quebec with a Bachelor of Architecture degree in 1980.

Career
Manasc is principal in the firm Manasc Isaac. Projects by her firm include the City of Calgary Water Centre, and the Mosaic Centre for Conscious Community and Commerce, a net-zero commercial building in Edmonton, Alberta.

As of 2021, Manasc is the chair of the board of Athabasca University.

She was awarded the Alberta Order of Excellence in 2017.

References

1956 births
Living people
Architects from Bucharest
20th-century Canadian architects
21st-century Canadian architects
Canadian women architects
Members of the Alberta Order of Excellence
20th-century Canadian women